The discography of British girl group Atomic Kitten consists of three studio albums, seven compilation albums, four video albums, and twenty-one singles (including one single recorded as part of the cast of The Big Reunion). The group's debut album, Right Now, was released by Virgin Records in the United Kingdom in October 2000. It reached number thirty-nine on the UK Albums Chart and spawned four top twenty singles; "Right Now", "See Ya", "I Want Your Love" and "Follow Me". The album's sales did not meet the expectations of the label, and the group were to be dropped. However, the group managed to persuade the label to let them release one more single, "Whole Again", which reached number one on the UK Singles Chart for four weeks and number one in Germany for six weeks. Due to this success, all plans to drop the group were scrapped. The group then released "Eternal Flame", a cover of The Bangles hit, which also reached number one in the UK. Atomic Kitten then re-issued the album Right Now, and it topped the charts in the UK and was certified double Platinum.

Their second album, Feels So Good, peaked at number one in the UK in September 2002 and went double Platinum. The second single from the album, "The Tide Is High (Get the Feeling)", topped the charts in the UK for three weeks. Preceded by the singles "If You Come to Me" and "Be with You", Atomic Kitten's third and final studio album, Ladies Night, peaked at number five in the UK in November 2003. Although it was not as successful as their previous albums, it was still certified Platinum. The singles produced from Ladies Night were also not as successful as their previous releases, although four of them reached the top ten in the UK. The most successful was "If You Come to Me", which peaked at number three. In 2004, Atomic Kitten announced they were going on a hiatus and released a greatest hits album, which peaked at number five in the UK and was certified Gold. Atomic Kitten have released three more singles: "Cradle 2005", which reached number ten in the UK, and the charity singles "All Together Now (Strong Together)" in 2006, which reached number 16 in Germany and "Anyone Who Had a Heart" in 2008, which reached number seventy-seven in the UK. An unofficial compilation album, The Essential Collection, was released on 13 February 2012, but was ineligible to chart. In 2021,  McClarnon and Hamilton were rejoined by Frost to record a football themed version of "Whole Again", entitled "Southgate You're the One (Football's Coming Home Again)", which was released by Sony's Columbia Records and charted at number 86 on 9 July 2021 after a few days on sale. It later peaked at number 14 on 16 July

Albums

Studio albums

Compilation albums

Video releases

Singles

As lead artist

As featured artist

Other appearances

Music videos

Notes
A ^ Released only as a promotional single in the UK and Australia.
B ^ Released as a double A-side single in the UK and Ireland.

References
General

 [ "Atomic Kitten > Discography"]. AllMusic. Retrieved 2010-10-22
 [ "Atomic Kitten > Credits"]. AllMusic. Retrieved 2010-10-22

Specific

External links
 

Discography
Discographies of British artists
Pop music group discographies